Mjolnir, known more formally as Mjölnir  is a fictional magical weapon appearing in American comic books published by Marvel Comics. It is depicted as the principal weapon of the superhero Thor. Mjolnir, which first appears in Journey into Mystery #83 (Aug. 1962), was created by writers Stan Lee and Larry Lieber and designed by artists Jack Kirby and Joe Sinnott.

Mjolnir is typically depicted as a large, square-headed gray sledgehammer, with a short, round handle wrapped in brown leather, culminating in a looped lanyard. The object is based on Mjölnir, the weapon of the mythological Thor.

Publication history
Mjolnir debuted in Marvel Comics title Journey into Mystery #83 (Aug. 1962), being the means by which physician Donald Blake transformed into thunder god Thor Odinson (by striking it on the ground). The first use of the hammer's name was in the "Tales of Asgard" feature in Thor #135 (Dec. 1966) in a story by Stan Lee and Jack Kirby. The weapon's origin is eventually revealed in Thor Annual #11 (1983), with another version presented in Thor vol. 2, #80 (Aug. 2004).

In a 2002 documentary with Kevin Smith, Lee says his brother and co-creator Larry Lieber originally referred to Mjolnir as the "Uru Hammer". Writer Roy Thomas eventually changed the name of the hammer to the mythologically correct name of "Mjolnir" but maintained the Larry Lieber concept of it being composed of fictional metal "uru".

Origin
Mjolnir's origin in Marvel continuity mirrors the original Norse legend. The hammer is created when Odin's adopted son Loki cuts off the hair of the goddess Sif as part of a cruel jest, and, when threatened with violence by Thor, promises to fetch replacement hair from the dwarf smiths. Loki commissions the hair from the Sons of Ivaldi, and the obliging dwarves create the hair and a magic ship and spear as gifts for the gods. Loki is convinced that no one can match their workmanship, and challenges a dwarf named Eitri to make finer treasures. Eitri creates a golden ring and golden boar spear with magical properties, and then begins work on a hammer. Loki panics at the sight of the treasures, and, afraid he will lose the wager, transforms himself into a gadfly and stings Eitri's assistant on the brow as he is working the bellows for the forge. The assistant stops for a moment to wipe away the blood, and the bellows fall flat. As a result, the hammer's handle is shorter in length than Eitri had originally intended, meaning that the hammer could only be wielded one-handed.

Despite the error, the Norse gods consider Eitri to have forged the greater treasures. Loki loses the bet and in retaliation the Sons of Ivaldi sew Loki's lips shut. The ruler of the Norse gods, Odin, uses the hammer – called Mjolnir ("Grinder") by Eitri – and eventually passes it to his son Thor, on the condition that he first prove he is worthy to wield the weapon.

In Thor Annual #11, the origin is changed in small but subtle ways. First, the treasures are commissioned by Odin as gifts for both of his boys, but Loki forfeits his share when he touches Gungnir, Odin's spear. Secondly, Loki turns into a moth instead of a gadfly, and just annoys Eitri instead of biting him. Thirdly, while the dwarfs still forge the golden duplicating ring known as Draupnir and Mjolnir, instead of making a golden boar spear they just make a magic gold boar that can fly.

In the second volume of Thor, another version of the hammer's origin is depicted when Odin orders the dwarven blacksmiths Eitri, Brok and Buri to forge Mjolnir using the core of a star.

The series The Mighty Thor provides another version of Mjolnir's origin: after an extended battle Odin traps a galaxy-sized storm called "Mother Storm" in a nugget of uru, which Odin orders the dwarves to use to create a weapon capable of using Mother Storm's power.

Enchantments
Odin placed several enchantments upon Mjolnir prior to Thor wielding the hammer:

 This is reflected in the inscription on the side of Mjolnir, which states: Whosoever holds this hammer, if he be worthy, shall possess the power of Thor. For almost the entirety of Marvel continuity, this has exclusively been Thor. 
 Once thrown it will always return to the wielder's hand after being thrown. By hurling the hammer and holding the lanyard, Thor is capable of flight. 
 The wielder can control the elements of storm (lightning, wind, and rain) by stamping its handle twice on the ground. 
 Mjolnir can open interdimensional portals, allowing its wielder to travel to other dimensions (such as from Earth to Asgard)
 Also originally capable of creating chronal displacement and therefore allowing time travel. This enchantment was removed by the entity Immortus with Thor's consent to aid a planet trapped in Limbo. This was eventually revealed to be a deception by Immortus to eliminate the superhero team the Avengers' access to time travel. Thor, however, is still able to manipulate time with Mjolnir.
 Thor can transform into the guise of a mortal, the physician Donald Blake, by stamping the hammer's head on the ground once and willing the change. When Thor transforms into Blake, his hammer takes the appearance of a wooden walking cane. Odin also stipulated that if Thor was separated from Mjolnir for more than sixty seconds, he would revert to his mortal persona until striking the cane once again.

The last enchantment was eventually removed and transferred to Stormbreaker, the hammer of character Beta Ray Bill which was commissioned by Odin as a replica of Mjolnir. After this the Donald Blake persona disappeared (eventually returning from the after life), and Thor assumed a civilian identity simply by changing into modern clothing (carrying Mjolnir concealed within a duffel bag). Thor eventually adopts the mortal persona of Jake Olson as penance for accidentally causing the original Olson's death during a battle, and simply pounds a fist to effect a change. During this period Mjolnir would disappear when Thor became Olson, and reappear when returning to his true form. Thor was also once again bound by the original rule whereby he would revert to Olson if kept away from Mjolnir for more than a minute.

The enchantment eventually changes: during the Original Sin storyline, Nick Fury whispers an undisclosed secret to Thor that causes him to lose the ability to pick up Mjolnir. The change extends to other gods, as Odin also cannot lift it (Fury's comment to Thor was simply "Gorr was right", validating to Thor that an old foe's claim that gods brought only pain and suffering was correct). The hammer is subsequently picked up by an unknown female – later revealed to be Jane Foster – who inherits the power and title of Thor, with the inscription changing to read if she be worthy.

Powers and abilities
 As one of the most formidable weapons known to man or god, Mjolnir is described as impacting with sufficient force to "level mountains" as well as entire worlds.  with only fictional metal adamantium proving impervious.

Capable of creating:
 huge vortices
 antimatter particles 
 forcefields (capable of containing an explosion that could potentially destroy a galaxy);
 Emitting mystical blasts of energy; controlling electromagnetism; molecular manipulation;

Generating exceptional offensives:
 Geo-Blast (an energy wave that taps a planet's gravitational force) 
 Anti-Force (energy created to counter-act another force)
 God Blast (an energy blast that taps into Thor's life force)

Mjolnir can also absorb energy;
 draining the Asgardian powers of the Wrecking Crew into the Wrecker 
 draining the life-force of villain the Presence
 removing the force field of the villain Juggernaut

The hammer is also capable of empowering others – accidentally endowing the hero Union Jack with the ability to generate electricity – and removing any harmful radiation or other toxins from a host.

There are also several rarely used abilities:
 tracking a person
 locating mystical items
 detecting illusions
 project images, as Thor shows a glimpse of Asgard to fellow Avenger Iron Man.

As a former religious relic, Mjolnir is also lethal to the undead, causing creatures such as vampires to burst into flame and crumble to dust.

Mjolnir is also not indestructible, having been damaged or destroyed several times in continuity: a force beam from the Asgardian Destroyer slices it in two; the Molecule Man dispels the atomic bonds between the hammer's molecules, vaporizing Mjolnir; shattered after channeling an immeasurable amount of energy at the Celestial Exitar; Dark god Perrikus slices Mjolnir in half with a magical scythe; and shattered when it collided with the uru weapons of Loki's Storm Giant followers, resulting in an atomic-scale explosion. Mjolnir was not recreated after this last incident until Thor returned to Earth several years later.
Temporary wielder Jane Foster sacrifices Mjolnir and herself to defeat the monster Mangog by hurling them all into the Sun. Thor and Odin are able to resurrect Jane, who subsequently presents Thor with the last fragment of his hammer.

During the War of the Realms storyline, Thor is able to channel the power of the ancient Mother Storm to reforge Mjolnir, declaring that Gorr was right and vowing to prove himself better than the gods who had come before.

Wielders
Other than Thor and Odin, certain other individuals have proven worthy of lifting Mjolnir in the primary continuity:

 Roger "Red" Norvell (a deliberate ruse by Odin)
 Beta Ray Bill
 Buri (also known as Tiwaz, Thor's great-grandfather)
 Captain America in his "The Captain" role
 Eric Masterson
 Bor (Thor's grandfather)
 Loki
 Jane Foster
 The Destroyer
 Squirrel Girl
 Black Panther (of Avengers 1,000,000 B.C.)
 Eddie Brock (with help from the Enigma Force)

Alternate versions of the Silver Surfer, Conan, Black Widow, and Valkyrie have lifted Mjolnir through worthiness. Other Marvel characters have lifted Mjolnir not through worthiness but through technicalities such as absorbing Thor's powers, including the Air-Walker, Awesome Android, Magneto, Rogue, Wonder Man, and Doctor Doom.

Moon Knight also has the ability to lift Mjolnir as it is made from Uru, a metal ore from the moon of a dead universe. So, with the help of Khonshu's influence, Moon Knight has the ability to control the hammer.

Two DC Comics characters have lifted Mjolnir in Marvel/DC crossover events:

 Wonder Woman
 Superman with Odin's permission, and was unable to lift it later.

Several imitations of Mjolnir have also existed:

 Odin gifts the hammer Stormbreaker to Beta Ray Bill
 Odin gifts the mace Thunderstrike to Thunderstrike 
 Loki creates the hammer Stormcaster for Storm in an attempt to control her, but she uses Mjolnir to destroy it
 Loki provides another version to Deadpool to spite Thor 
 Loki also allows Surtur to use the forge Mjolnir was created from to craft copies during Ragnarok 
 HYDRA creates an evil version of Thor wielding a technological imitation of Mjolnir
 Tony Stark and Reed Richards create an imitation Mjolnir for their clone Ragnarok 
 The frog Throg discovers a sliver of Mjolnir that transforms into the hammer Frogjolnir

Other versions
In the Ultimate Marvel imprint title The Ultimates and its sequel The Ultimates 2, the Ultimate version of Thor wields a Mjolnir styled after a classical war hammer, with no restrictions on who can wield it. The origin of this Mlojnir is first told in Ultimates 2 when the European Defense Initiative were making a Norway super soldier program involving a battery-powered suit and hammer with the hammer acting as a portable power unit, though twisted by Loki's manipulations of reality tricking everyone that Thor was actually his mentally unbalanced brother who stole the suit. In Ultimate Comics: Thor, the traditional hammer appears made by Odin's workers and sought after by Loki on Earth. This version was used a plot device when the hammer temporarily crossed over into the mainstream Earth-616 universe, being found and used by the Asgardian Volstagg and later Jane Foster before being destroyed. The surviving fragments are reassembled into another weapon for Foster once she abandons the Thor persona.

Marvel Cinematic Universe

Mjolnir is a recurring item throughout the Marvel Cinematic Universe (MCU) media franchise, most often used by Thor. Like its comic book counterpart, it is a powerful Asgardian hammer used as an offensive, defensive, and projectile weapon. It is capable of controlling and conjuring weather including lightning, and allows the carrier to fly if the hammer is spun and released with enough power. Mjolnir is enchanted by Odin, requiring any person who lifts it to be "worthy" and grants the user "the power of Thor" if they are able to do so.

Appearances
Mjolnir is first seen in the MCU in a post-credits scene in Iron Man 2 (2010), in which S.H.I.E.L.D. agent Phil Coulson reports on the hammer being found in an impact crater in the New Mexican desert.
In Thor (2011), the hammer is used by Thor as he battles hordes of Frost Giants on Jotunheim. Odin strips Thor of his power and casts him and Mjolnir to Earth. Crowds of humans gather in an effort to lift it, attracting the attention of S.H.I.E.L.D. Thor eventually finds Mjolnir but is unable to lift it until he later proves his worthiness by sacrificing his life against the Destroyer. The hammer appears to instantly heal his injuries when he holds it and he uses it to defeat the Destroyer. He battles Loki with it, countering Gungnir, Odin's staff, and uses the hammer to destroy the Bifröst Bridge.
In The Avengers (2012), Thor uses the hammer in combat throughout. He battles Tony Stark in his Iron Man armor, and Stark's arc reactor is able to absorb the lightning conjured by Mjolnir to increase his armor's power. It clashes with Steve Rogers' vibranium shield, creating a massive shockwave that knocks both parties down. Thor also battles The Hulk (who fails to lift it during the confrontation), Loki, and Chitauri soldiers. During the Battle of New York, he uses the hammer to bottleneck the massive portal above New York City, combining its lightning with the Chrysler Building as an amplifier to destroy numerous Chitauri reinforcements and their Leviathans. 
In Thor: The Dark World (2013), Thor uses the hammer throughout to battle the Dark Elf Malekith and his minions.
In Avengers: Age of Ultron (2015), Thor uses the hammer in battle against Hydra soldiers, hitting it against Rogers' shield to create massive shockwaves capable of destroying tanks. When Thor challenges the other Avengers to lift Mjolnir at a party, all fail save for Rogers, who manages to move it slightly, shocking Thor. When Stark and Banner create the Vision, the Avengers are mistrustful of the synthezoid until he casually lifts Mjolnir. Later, the Vision is shown capable of using the hammer during a fight. Stark and Rogers later jest that Vision is not truly "worthy" as he is an artificial intelligence, comparing him to an elevator that would continue to work if Mjolnir were placed inside.
In Thor: Ragnarok (2017), Thor uses the hammer to defeat the fire demon Surtur and his minions. When Odin dies, Thor's sister Hela escapes from her prison. Thor throws Mjolnir at her but she catches and destroys it. Thor's exploration of Hela's origins reveals to him that Mjolnir was originally her weapon. Odin tells Thor that the hammer is also a means to control his power and that it alone does not make him the "God of Thunder". 
In Avengers: Endgame (2019), Thor retrieves an alternate version of Mjolnir from Asgard in an alternate 2013 timeline during the "Time Heist" to gather the Infinity Stones and undo the Blip. When he returns to the main timeline, he brings Mjolnir with him and uses it during the fight against an alternate Thanos. Thor combines it with Stormbreaker, and uses its lightning to supercharge Stark's Iron Man armor during their fight. When Thanos overwhelms and nearly kills Thor, Rogers uses Mjolnir to save Thor's life, who is pleased to confirm his suspicions about Rogers' worthiness. Rogers battles Thanos with it, combining the hammer with his shield for offensive and defensive combination attacks. Rogers is also able to conjure lightning. During the final battle with Thanos and his entire army, Rogers uses Mjolnir as he leads the Avengers and their allies into battle. Following Thanos' defeat, Rogers returns Mjolnir to its timeline. 
A broken, alternate version of Mjolnir owned by Throg appears in the fifth episode of Loki (2021) in the Void.
An alternate version of Mjolnir appears in the second episode of What If...? (2021) as part of the Collector's collection on Knowhere. Another version appears in the seventh episode, which Thor uses to fight against Captain Marvel. For unexplained reasons, Thor remains the only one able to lift the hammer in this universe despite Odin never shown enchanting it with the "worthy" spell.
 Mjolnir returns in Thor: Love and Thunder (2022) with Jane Foster wielding a reconstructed version of the hammer. Now using the alias of Mighty Thor, she uses the hammer in the battle against Gorr the God Butcher and his forces. When Foster is diagnosed with terminal cancer, she researches that Mjolnir gives its wielder enhanced strength and stamina. She travels to New Asgard in search of the remnants of Mjolnir, which reassembles itself in Jane's presence and proclaims her worthy, surprising Thor when he meets her again. Now when the hammer is launched from its wielder, it can separate into its fragments to hit multiple targets at once before reassembling. A flashback reveals that years earlier, Thor unknowingly enchanted Mjolnir to protect her. Foster learns that use of the hammer is actually exacerbating her cancer by draining her life force. In the final confrontation with Gorr, she uses the hammer to destroy the Necrosword, at the cost of her life. Thor once again takes possession of Mjolnir following her death.

Stormbreaker

In Avengers: Infinity War (2018), Thor travels to Nidavellir with Rocket and Groot to ask the dwarf king Eitri for a replacement weapon. Eitri has a design called Stormbreaker prepared, an axe meant to be the most powerful in the Asgardian king's arsenal with powers similar to Mjolnir and capable of summoning the Bifröst Bridge. Thor helps Eitri restart the damaged forge to heat the ore, and Groot creates a handle to finish the axe. Stormbreaker is capable of conjuring massive lightning attacks, allows Thor to fly, and serves as a two-handed offensive weapon capable of withstanding attacks from the Infinity Gauntlet. He continues to wield it during Avengers: Endgame, and uses the axe to decapitate Thanos and later to battle the alternate version of Thanos and his army. Thor uses Stormbreaker during Thor: Love and Thunder, but later gives it to Love while reclaiming use of the restored Mjölnir for himself.

References

External links
 
 

Thor (Marvel Comics)
Norse mythology in Marvel Comics
Hammers
Fantasy weapons